The Limbu  (exonym) or Yakthung (endonym) are a Sino-Tibetan indigenous tribe (Bhot-Burmeli) of the Himalayan region of eastern Nepal, Sikkim, and western Bhutan.

The original name of the Limbu is Yakthung or Yakthum. Limbu males are called Yakthungba or Yakthumba and Limbu females are called "Yakthumma" or "Yakthungma". Ancient texts state that "Yakthung" or "Yakthum" is a derivative of Yaksha and some interpret its meaning as the "Yaksha winner". In the Limbu language it means "heroes of the hills" (Yak - hills, thung or thum - heroes or mighty warriors), which connotates with the ancient Kiratis.

Subba is a title given by the Shah Kings only to Limbu village chiefs. Subba was not an indigenous Yakthung terminology, but now the two terms are almost interchangeable. People often debate about the use of term "Subba" as their surname in Limbu tribe. It is important to note that only the village chiefs were allowed to use the term Subba in their name. It was how the village chiefs were distinguished from other villagers in Limbu tribe. Family lineage of the village chiefs are often found with their surname as Subba.

Their history is said to be written in a book called Bangsawoli (Genealogy), also known as Bansawali. Some ancient families have kept copies. There are hundreds of Limbu clans and tribes, classified under their tribe or subnational entity or according to their place of origin.

The Chinese text Po-ou-Yeo-Jing, translated in 308 AD, refers to the Yi-ti-Sai (barbarians bordering on the north), a name which is an exact equivalent of  
The Limbu were also one of the earliest inhabitants of Sikkim. The name of the Indian state itself is a combination of two Limbu words: su, which means "new", and khyim, which means "palace" or "house".

The estimated population of the Limbu is 700,000, mainly in the districts of Sankhuwasabha, Tehrathum, Dhankuta, Taplejung, Morang, Sunsari, Jhapa, Panchthar, and Ilam in Nepal. These are all within the Mechi and Kosi Zones or "Limbuwan". Portions of the Limbu population are also located in the eastern and western districts of Sikkim. A smaller population is scattered throughout the cities of Darjeeling, and Kalimpong in West Bengal, Assam, Nagaland, Bhutan, and Myanmar. Some have migrated to the United Kingdom, Hong Kong, the United States, and other countries.

History

Language

Limbu is one of the few Sino-Tibetan languages of the Central Himalayas that possesses its own pre-20th century scripts.

Culture

Limbu practice many of their own life cycle rituals. They believe that lineage is not transmitted patrilineally. Rather, a woman inherits her mother's gods, and when she marries and lives with her husband she brings with her the deities that will then be recognized as the household deities.

Limbu bury their dead, and practice and observe death rituals for two to three days. During a death ceremony, they put the head of the dead person in a chares ko thal (Brass bowl), and coin on the forehead. They block the nose and ear and put alcohol on the lips of the dead body. Nikwasamma is a death ritual done to cleanse the house by Phedangma. Relatives, neighbours, and visitors bring money as respect and put an offering on the top of the dead body. Sons of dead person shave their head and eyebrows in respect for the body of the dead. They are recognized as the new heir in the family. The sons bury the dead body, covering it with white cloth, in a wooden box. The length of the mourning period varies depending on the gender of the deceased.

Weddings, mourning, gift exchanges, and conflict resolution involve consumption of alcohol, especially the Limbu traditional beer popularly known as thee which is drunk from a container called tongba. Dances are arranged for visitors to the village. These affairs give young Limbu girls and boys a chance to meet and enjoy dancing and drinking.

Attire and ornaments

The traditional dress of the Limbus are mekhli and taga.

While performing mangsewa  (God+worship), Yakthung  people wear mekhli and taga, white in colour, which symbolizes purity.

Dhaka is the traditional fabric of the Limbu which woven in geometric patterns in a handloom. The art of making Dhaka is taught by one generation to another. Limbu men wear dhaka topi (hat) and scarves, and Limbu women wear dhaka saree, mekhli, blouse and shawl.

Female dress and ornament
 Mekhli: It is a long dress worn with a horizontal strip of cloth, with collars crossing over or in a V-neck style(Laghea).
 Chunglokek/sunghamba:  It is a type of blouse.
 Chaubandi Cholo- It is a type of blouse with collars overlapping one another.
 Sim 'gunyo' in Nepali: It is a long strip of cloth wrapped around like a skirt.
 Phaoee : It is a kind of waist belt.

Limbu women are known for their gold jewellery. Besides samyang  (gold), they wear yuppa (silver), luung  (glass stones), ponche (coral/amber), and mudhin (turquoise). Most Limbu ornaments are inspired by nature. Some jewelry types are:
 Samyanfung  (Gold flower): It is a huge circular disc of gold. The common design features a coral in the centre. Samyangfung  represents the sun.
 Nessey   ( ne>nekho ear +se>to bulge)- It is a large circular flattened gold earring. Common designs includes water springs with coral or glass stones. 
 Laskari: It is gold earrings worn continuously on the ear lobes in the shape of leaves, diamonds etc.
 Namloyee or yogakpa: It is large silver necklace in the shape of a square or circle embedded with coral stones,turquoise. It is also known as chandrahaara. Similar to Tibetan ghau.
 Yangyichi or Reji: It is a long necklace with silver coins.
 Sesephung (Bright Flower): It is a forehead piece with coral moon.
 Yarling: It is lotus bud shaped earrings.
 Pongwari or kantha: It is necklace with golden beads and red felt.
 Hukpangi: It is a type of silver bangle.
 Swagep: It is a finger ring.
 Ponche: It is a red coral bead.
Besides these, there are many other jewelleries worn by Limbu women.

Male dress and ornaments

 Paga: It is a headwear that is pointed and ties at the back with long strips.
 Ningkheng: It is kind of a muffler.
 Phaoee :  It is kind of a waist belt
 Sandokpa: It is an upper body dress.
 Sungrehba: It is a coat-like upper body dress.
 Lapetta and pagappa: It is an upper body dress.
 Paohao: It is a main body dress.
 Hangchang: It is an upper body dress for royal family.
 Hangpen: It is a lower body dress for royal family.
This form of clothing was worn until Nepal enforced a "one religion, one dress, one language" policy. The Yakthung of Sikkim still wear traditional Limbu clothing. Many efforts are being made by groups such as Yakthung Chumlung to raise awareness about the cultural dress and its heritage.

Limbu traditional architecture
The house of the Limbu is a symbolic representation of a feminine character, Yuma — a goddess of the Limbu community. The details of the windows and doors are embroidered with wood carvings depicting different flowers which are used by the Limbu during rituals. Some decorative embroideries done in the wood carvings of the door and windows of the house are the direct representation of gold jewelry worn by Limbu women. In a traditional house of the Limbu, the skirting of the wall is generally painted manually with red mud paint. This is also a symbolic representation of the patuka or the belt worn by the Limbu women.

The major distinct element of the house in the muring-sitlam or the main pillar/column of the house which is in the centre of the house in the ground floor. This pillar is generally believed by the Limbu people as the shrine where Yuma goddess resides in the house. Thus, to pay their gratitude they perform ritualistic prayers and offerings around the pillar, usually twice a year.

These houses can be found at Eastern Nepal and western part of Sikkim, India. These houses are similar to other communities due to acculturation between different communities living in the vicinity. The evolution of the form and spaces of the houses have been inspired by the everyday lifestyle and culture of the people which is similar in many communities. Therefore, nowadays a Limbu house is difficult to identify through an exterior perspective.

Use of geometrical shapes as circle, triangle and square in certain pattern, painted with different colors can be found on the facade of the buildings which is only done by limbu tribe. Besides that, display of the symbol called Silam-sakma (a ritualistic element used by the phedangmas or tribal priests) in the house elevation has been a symbol/logo for identifying with the Limbu community. This symbol is diamond shaped and has 9 concentric diamond layers supported by two axes at the centre, one vertical and one horizontal. These days, this symbol is seen in places like the entry gates, balcony railing of the house, etc. It is also worn by the community people on their left chest during an event.

Currently, the traditional houses are endangered. People are also unable to bear expenses for wood carvings for the embroideries which has resulted in the extinction of local craftsmen and hence the traditional design itself.

Flag

The Limbu people have their own flag. The blue represents the bodies of water and the sky, the white represents air and peace, and the red represents the earth and pure blood of the Limbu people. The sun in the centre represents various Limbu spiritual practices and everyday living. The use and recognition of the flag ended in the eighteenth century during the Gorkha invasion. Limbuwan organisations use the flag in Limbuwan laaje areas.

Lifestyle
The Limbu practice subsistence farming traditionally. Rice and maize comprises their principal crops. Although there is an abundance of arable land, productivity is greatly limited by inefficient technology. Excess crops are often traded for food that cannot be grown in the region. Limbu women weave Dhaka fabric cloth on their traditional small hand looms made from bamboo and wood. In the olden days, the Limbu were skilled in silk farming. The Kiratis were also known as silk traders.

Wedding practices

Limbu generally marry within their own community. A Limbu is not allowed to marry within their own clans for up to 3 generations back to ensure that they are not related. Cross-cousin marriage is not allowed in Limbu culture. Marriage between a man and a woman outside the clan is also possible either by arrangement or by mutual consent of the man and woman in question. Being matriarchal tribe, females are given due respect.

The marriages are mostly arranged by parents. Asking for a woman's hand is an important ceremony. In that system, the woman can ask for anything, including any amount of gold, silver, etc. This is practiced to confirm that the man is financially secure enough to keep the bride happy. A few days after the wedding, the man's family members have to visit the woman's house with a piglet and some alcoholic and non-alcoholic beverages, depending upon the financial status of his house. The most important ceremonies of a Limbu wedding take place in the groom's house rather than in the bride's because the bride has to stay with her husband. There are two special dances in this ceremony, one is called Yalakma or dhan nach in Nepali (rice harvest dance) and "Kelangma"   or Chyabrung  in Nepali. The Yalakma  is characterized by men and women dancing in a slow circle, whereas the Kelangma   consists of complex footwork synchronized with the beat of the drums. Anyone can join the dance, which can last for many hours. The Yalakma  can also be a celebration of the harvest season or other social occasions.

It is conventionally said that the customs and traditions of Limbus were established in the distant past by Sawa Yethang   (council of eight kings).

Religion and festivals

The Limbu follow the social rules and regulation of Mundhum oral 'scripture' and a religious book. The high god of the Limbu is called Tagera Ningwaphumang , which may be translated simply as "Supreme Body of Knowledge". Their God Tagera Ningwaphuma is described as a forceful power the creator of life on earth. In earthly form, Tagera Ningwaphuma is worship as the goddess Yuma Sammang   and her male counterpart Theba Sammang. The deity Yuma  (literally: "Grandmother" or "Mother Earth") known as "Yuma Samyo" or "Niwaphuma" is the most important and popular among some Limbu and is worshiped in all occasions. Yuma  is the mother of all the Limbus, therefore one regards his or her mother as a goddess. They also have many different classes of ritual specialists, of which "Phedangma", "Yema/Yeba"  , and "Shamba" are some. Their religion is enshrined in the evergreen Cynodondactylon (Dubo) grass.

Traditionally, the Limbu bury their dead, but due to the influence of Hinduism, cremation is becoming popular. The Limbu people also have their own clergy, such as Phedangma , Samba, Yeba (male) Yeba-Yema   (female). Limbu people follow Kirat religion. Some limbu have converted to Christianity. A very different reformist tradition was established by the Limbu guru Phalgunanda, who established the 'Satyahang' religion.

Traditional music and singing styles
 Limbu have a strong belief in "Yumawad". Yumawad is a type of religious scripture which has been kept alive by their religious leaders and handed down verbally from generation to generation. Some of the retellings of Yumawad are also included in Limbu traditional music with social stories, dreams, and everyday life. There has been a rich tradition of the Limbu singing their folk songs. Their folk songs can be divided into the following groups:

 Khyali - a conversational song in which young lash and lads sing in very poetic expressions and in a very sweet tone.
 Traditional Love Songs -
 Sakpa Palam  Samlo - This song is sung during the Kusakpa Yaalang  dance in a fast beat.
 Kemba Palam  Samlo - This song is sung during the Kemba Yeaaˀlang dance in a slow beat.
 Domke Akma Palam   Samlo - It is sung when doing the normal chores and also during the Domke Akma dance.
 Hakpare Samlo - this song is sung by middle-aged men and women who have interest in Mundhum and who are well versed in it. One can find spiritual and worldly specialties in this song.
 Nisammang  Sewa Samlo - This song is sung during religious functions. It is a devotional song. Dancing is an important aspect of life among Limbus. Based on acting style, the following types of dances are performed:
 Dance performed after origin of life: This type of dance is known as Ke Lang or Chyabrung dance. The dance imitates the actions of animals, insects and any form of living beings.
 Agricultural dance: Under this type of dance there are -
 Yea Kakma- This dance is performed in the evening after the crops are reaped.
 Damke Akme- This dance is performed while sowing crops.
 War dance: This form of dance is known as 'Nahangma '. It is performed during "Nahangma "- their religious function. Before Nahangma dance, Manggena traditional ritual is performed at home and all the blood relatives, cousins are present.  During Manggena, stone refer as god with red tika offered is put on banana leaf. A large adult black homegrown pig is killed and present to phedangba. A Junglefowl is given to each person according to match with person's age and gender same as of their Junglefowl. Person who cannot be present due to problems will be done by their closest family member on their behalf. Phedangba say vision of each person when they present their own Junglefowl and later Phedangma beheaded the Junglefowl and sprinkle the blood. They eat their own charcoal burned Junglefowl liver with salt eaten with rice. The rest of meat are prepared for meal Bhutuwa or mixed yangben with rice for dinner. After the Manggena, Nahangma is performed that his spirit has become strong and reached at the top of Chuklung and returned from Chuklung. Chuklung means top of Himalayas. However, this can be done by only those who have no father. In this dance, only adult males and "Shamani" priests can take part. During the dance,they carry a Phedza in their right hand and a domesticated young adult male Junglefowl in their left hand or sword in their right hand and a shield in their left hand, or an arrow in their right hand and a bow in their left hand.

The traditional ritual are done according to the tribes and clans. Some tribes won't eat chicken or buff or mutton while some tribes have different way in celebrating war dance ritual.

 Historical dance: In this dance form, the historical war of ten Limbu fought in Aambepojoma  Kamketlungma is depicted.
 Mysterious and ancient dance performed by Shamani priests: this type of dance is known as Yagrangsing, Phungsok Lang, Tongsing Lang. The dance is performed only by the Shamani priests.

Traditional food
Alcohol is significantly and religiously important to the Limbu culture. Limbu usually made their traditional dish from homegrown domesticated livestock meats like pork, fish and yak over factory farming. They are also domesticated for religious purpose. In general, they consume dhal bhat tarkari with pickle. Dhal (beans soup), bhat (rice), tarkari (curry) and different kinds of achar(pickle). Limbu people always use Phedza to prepare meats. Famous Limbu cuisines are 

 Chembikeek sumbak (oil-fried kinema with spices), (Kinema: fermented soyabean)
 Chhurpi (made of Yak, buttermilk)
 Filinge achar (Niger seed pickle)
 Gundruk Nepalese (fermented leafy vegetables with soup)
 Kaan sadeko (fried pork ears)
 Khareng (maize/ millet/ wheat roti baked and cooked)
 Khoreng (Baked roti made from wheat/ millet/ buckwheat/ riceflour)
 Kinema (fermented beans with soup)
 Lunghakcha (baked, maize flour rolled in maize khosela)
 Macha ko siddra (dried river fish)
 Mandokpenaa thee (fermented millet beverage served with Tongba)
 Mohi sumbak (oil-fried mohi with spices)
 Mula ko acchar (radish pickle)
 Nambong muchhi (Silam mixed with chilli, dry pickle)
 Pena manda (millet flour cooked in more water)
 Phando (chutney made from mix of soybean and chilli powder)
 Phanokeek sumbak (oil-fried fermented bamboo shoots with spices)
 Phung khey sejonwa (maize/millet distilled liquor)
 Poponda (finger millet flour wrapped in leaves)
 [Faksa Dameko] (Pan-seared pork)
 Pork sekuwa (spicy chopped)
 Sagee sumbak (neetle tender shots, flower/fruits curry)
 Sakhekya (dry meat beef)
 Sargyang (pork blood intestine)
 Sekuwa (pork, chicken, vegetables skewers)
 Sibligaan (wild edible greens with bitter taste and high in antioxidant)
 Sijongwaa aara 
 Sigolya and Penagolya (Baked, millet or barley flour rolled)
 Sungur ko khutta daal (pork feet in cooked lentil soup)
 Sura-keek sumbak (oil-fried moldy cheese with spices)
 Sura sumbak (oil-fried cheese with spices)
 Tongba traditional drink
 Wamyuk (hen's inner feathers, liver, hands, wings, intestine and spices curry)
 Yakhoo Kusee muchee (seed of pumpkin chilli)
 Yangben (wild edible lichen) 
 Yangben-Faksa (Pork Curry with Yangben)
 Yangben sumbak (pork blood liver with yangben)
 Yumé (bhutuwa, a religious Mangena food meats cooked in blood)

There are some taboos while eating the foods. They use a variety of plants and herbs for medicine. Limbu always welcome their guests with foods, Tongba (traditional beverage millet beer), Rakshi (traditional alcoholic beverage), Lassi (yoghurt milk drink ),  water and homemade fruit juices.

Folk musical instruments
Limbu musical instruments include the following:
Chyabrung
Yalambar Baja
Chethya/Yethala 
Mephrama 
Miklakom 
Niyari Hongsing Ke
Negra 
Phakwa 
The Phamuk is a melody instrument of Limbus which includes three bamboo pipes each about 4 cm thick are attached together side by side.
Phenjekom
Puttungey
Simikla
Taa is made of brass, 25 cm in diameter and one pair of cymbals weighs one kilo. It is played by unmarried Limbu women in Ke Lang.
Tetlafakwa  
Ting 
Tungeba 
Ungdung 
Yea Pongey

Traditional sports
For the Limbu people, Archery has always been considered as the main traditional sport. Archery often involves religious demonstrations and rituals. Historically, Limbu cavalry archers were important when resisting invasions before the pre-Nepal era. The word Limbu itself came from the word Lim-pfungh which in translation means "Shooting-Arrows" or "Act of archery".

There are legends about the beginning of the Limbuwan–Gorkha War. In these legends, a Gorkha military general met a Yakthung  hunter in a forest. When the general asked the hunter about his presence and what he was doing, the Yakthung  hunter replied "Lim-pfungh". The Gorkha army later experienced the fierceness from the Yakthung -Tribes' horseback archers for years during the Limbuwan–Gorkha War. Thus, the name "Limbu" was recorded on the papers of the Gorkhas to describe the Yakthung  people. However, after the success of the Gorkha invasion, horse breeding and keeping declined swiftly in Limbu territories.

Bare-hand Wrestling has also been practised among the Limbu men during festivals. This was also used to settle personal matters after a festive drinking in which the losing wrestler would have to pay the winner by buying him a drink or inviting him to his house for a drink of traditional tongba . naːnt͡ɕʰiŋma is the term for wrestling in Yakthung-pan .

Notable Limbu people

See also
Limbuwan
History of Limbuwan
Limbu Festivals
Chasok Tangnam 
Kiranti languages
Limbu language
Sirijunga script
Rambahadur Limbu
Tongba beverage
Limbu Clans and Tribes
Kirat Yakthung Chumlung social organization
Mundhum religion
Ethnic groups in Nepal
Ethnic groups in Bhutan
Indigenous peoples of Sikkim

References

Further reading
 
 Perumal Samy P Limbu in LSI Sikkim Part-I Page Nos.219-293 Published by Office of the Registrar General & Census Commissioner India, Ministry of Home 
 Affairs, Government of India, New Delhi
 Population Census of Sikkim 2011

External links
 
 Limbu alphabet
 Limbu language
 www.limbulibrary.com.np - Online Library of Kirat books, history, short story, language, script etc.
 History of kirat - historian authored by Iman Singh Chemjong, Nepal.
 www.censusindia.gov.in

 
Himalayan peoples
Sino-Tibetan-speaking people
Demographics of Nepal
Ethnic groups in Nepal
Indigenous peoples of Nepal
Ethnic groups in India
Ethnic groups in Bhutan
Nepalese culture
Culture of Sikkim
Ethnic groups in Northeast India
Ethnic groups in South Asia
Ethnic groups divided by international borders